Arnautoff is a surname. Notable people with the surname include:

Peter Arnautoff (born 1951), American soccer goalkeeper
Victor Arnautoff (1896–1979), Russian-American painter and professor